Tatem is a surname, and may refer to

Isaac Tatem Hopper, American abolitionist
Khalil Tatem, birth name of Filipino-Canadian rapper Killy
George Tatem, East India Company
Robert S. Tatem, Commander of the USS Chippewa
William Tatem, 1st Baron Glanely

See also
Tatum (surname)
Tate (surname)